Build may refer to: 

 Engineering something
 Construction
 Physical body stature, especially muscle size; usually of the human body
 Build (game engine), a 1995 first-person shooter engine
 "Build" (song), a 1987 song by The Housemartins
 Microsoft Build, a developer conference
 Software build, a compiled version of software, or the process of producing it

See also 
 
 
 Built (disambiguation)
 , German newspaper